Mark William Minor (born May 14, 1950) is a former National Basketball Association (NBA) player. Minor was drafted with the ninth pick in the eleventh round of the 1972 NBA draft by the Boston Celtics. In the 1972-73 NBA season, Minor appeared in four games for the Celtics, averaging 1.3 points and 1 rebound per game.

References

1950 births
Living people
American men's basketball players
Basketball players from Ohio
Boston Celtics draft picks
Boston Celtics players
Ohio State Buckeyes men's basketball players
Small forwards